Acacia lauta, commonly known as Tara wattle, is a shrub of the genus Acacia and the subgenus Phyllodineae that is endemic to north eastern Australia. It is rated as being vulnerable according to the Environment Protection and Biodiversity Conservation Act 1999.

Description
Like most species of Acacia it has phyllodes rather than true leaves. The spherical flower-heads contain 25 to 30 bright golden flowers.

The shrub is closely related to and resembles Acacia johnsonii and is part off the Acacia johnsonii group.

Distribution
It is native to a small area of south eastern Queensland on the Darling Downs between Tara and Inglewood growing in sandy soils as a part of open woodland communities.

See also
 List of Acacia species

References

lauta
Flora of Queensland
Plants described in 1980
Taxa named by Leslie Pedley